Joyce Ebert (June 26, 1933 – August 28, 1997) was an American actress. She was particularly known for her work as a dramatic actress at the Long Wharf Theatre in New Haven, Connecticut where she portrayed both leading and supporting roles in more than 80 productions. She also appeared on television and in films, and had a brief career as an opera singer.

Born in Homestead, Pennsylvania, Ebert graduated from the drama school at Carnegie Mellon University. In 1959 she won the San Diego Shakespeare Festival's Atlas Award. In 1961 she created the role of Betty Parris in the world premiere of Robert Ward's The Crucible at the New York City Opera. That same year she made her off-Broadway debut at the Phoenix Theatre debut as Ophelia in Hamlet. In 1964 she was the recipient of both the Clarence Derwent Award and the Obie Award for her appearance as  Andromache in The Trojan Women at Circle in the Square Theatre.

In 1977 she was nominated for a Drama Desk Award for her performance as Maggie in Michael Cristofer's The Shadow Box. In 1996 she was honored with the Connecticut Critics Circle's special achievement award.

Death
In 1997 she died of cancer in Southport, Connecticut, aged 64. She was married to actor Michael Ebert (1956-66) and then to director Arvin Brown.

References

External links

1933 births
1997 deaths
Actresses from Pennsylvania
American film actresses
American stage actresses
American television actresses
Deaths from cancer in Connecticut
Carnegie Mellon University College of Fine Arts alumni
Clarence Derwent Award winners
Obie Award recipients
People from Homestead, Pennsylvania
20th-century American actresses
20th-century American women opera singers
People from Southport, Connecticut
Singers from Pennsylvania
Classical musicians from Pennsylvania